Hazel Hill  is a small community in the Canadian province of Nova Scotia in the Municipality of the District of Guysborough in Guysborough County.

Engineers and skilled workers were brought from England and a planned white-collar community was built, including stylish homes, a tennis court, a cricket field and a curling rink.

Trans-Atlantic Telegraph Cable Station
Hazel Hill was chosen by the Commercial Cable Company in 1888 as the site for a trans-Atlantic cable station as it is the closest point of land in mainland North America to Europe. The station was housed in an imposing two-and-a-half storey brick and granite structure. The Hazel Hill trans-Atlantic cable station received a distress signal from the RMS Titanic on April 15, 1912, news concerning the end of World War I or Treaty of Versailles, and the Wall Street Crash of 1929. It ceased operation in 1962 and due to its poor condition was set to be demolished in 2017.

References

External links

Communities in Guysborough County, Nova Scotia